Michael Hansen (born 22 September 1971) is a Danish former professional football player, who played in the midfielder position. He played 40 games and scored two goals for various Danish youth national teams, and competed with the Denmark national under-21 football team at the 1992 Summer Olympics. He played for a number of Danish teams, including Silkeborg IF, Odense Boldklub, Esbjerg fB, and FC Midtjylland. He ended his playing career in 2006.

As a youngster he played for B1938. He shifted to B1901 - Nykøbing in 1985, where he immediately showed his skills. He was offered a professional contract a few years later and made his debut in the first team when he was only 16. When he was 18 he joined Næstved a team in the Danish Superliga.

He was the manager of the 1. division club Skive from 2008 to 2013.

He replaced Ove Pedersen as manager of FC Vestsjælland on 1 July 2014. His first season as manager of FC Vestsjælland ended in relegation from the Danish Superliga. Following af poor start to the 2015-16 Danish 1st Division he was sacked on 1 September 2015.

In August 2018 he became manager of Silkeborg IF until the end of the 2018-19-season. In August 2020 he was named new manager of FC Fredericia.

External links

Danish national team profile
Danish 1992 Olympic Squad
DanskFodbold.com profile
FCV profile

1971 births
Living people
Danish men's footballers
Denmark under-21 international footballers
Denmark youth international footballers
Olympic footballers of Denmark
Footballers at the 1992 Summer Olympics
Danish Superliga players
Danish 1st Division players
Eerste Divisie players
Silkeborg IF players
Odense Boldklub players
Esbjerg fB players
FC Midtjylland players
Danish expatriate men's footballers
Expatriate footballers in the Netherlands
Association football midfielders
People from Guldborgsund Municipality
FC Vestsjælland managers
Danish football managers
Skive IK managers
Silkeborg IF managers
FC Fredericia managers
Danish 1st Division managers
Sportspeople from Region Zealand